Sozopolis in Pisidia, which had been called Apollonia (Ἀπολλωνία) and Apollonias (Ἀπολλωνίας) during Seleucid times, was a town in the former Roman province of Pisidia, and is not to be confused with the Thracian Sozopolis in Haemimonto in present-day Bulgaria.

Location 
 
Sozopolis in Pisidia must have been situated in the border region of that province, since some ancient accounts place it in Phrygia. Its site may correspond to present-day Uluborlu in Isparta Province, Turkey. Older sources put it "Souzon, south of Aglasoun". Modern scholars locate its site near Uluborlu, Isparta Province.

History 
Stephanus of Byzantium says that Apollonia in Pisidia (Sozopolis) was originally called Mordiaeon or Mordiaïon (Μορδιάιον), and was celebrated for its quinces. The coins of Apollonia record Alexander the Great as the founder, and also the name of a stream that flowed; by it, the Hippopharas. Two Greek inscriptions of the Roman period copied by Francis Arundell give the full title of the town in that age, "the Boule and Demus of the Apolloniatae Lycii Thraces Coloni," by which he concluded that the city was founded by a Thracian colony established in Lycia, but that conclusion is not universally accepted.

Sozopolis in Pisidia was the birthplace of Severus of Antioch (born around 456).

The icon of the Theotokos of Pisidian Sozopolis, celebrated by Eastern Orthodox Christians on 3 September, originated in this city.

Fragments of the Res Gestae Divi Augusti in Greek have been found in the area.

Bishopric 

Sozopolis sent its bishop and possibly two other representatives to the Council of Constantinople in 381, and its bishop attended the Council of Ephesus in 431.

The see is included in the Catholic Church's list of titular sees.

References

Sources

Seleucid colonies in Anatolia
Former populated places in Turkey
Populated places in Pisidia
Roman sites in Turkey
Titular sees in Asia